NHK Science & Technology Research Laboratories (STRL), headquartered in Setagaya, Tokyo, Japan, is responsible for technical research at NHK, Japan's public broadcaster.

Work done by the STRL includes research on direct-broadcast satellite (BS), Integrated Services Digital Broadcasting, high-definition television, and ultra-high-definition television.

On May 9, 2013, NHK and Mitsubishi Electric announced that they had jointly developed the first High Efficiency Video Coding (HEVC) encoder for 8K Ultra HD TV, which is also called Super Hi-Vision (SHV). The HEVC encoder supports the Main 10 profile at Level 6.1 allowing it to encode 10-bit video with a resolution of 7680 × 4320 at 60 fps. The HEVC encoder has 17 3G-SDI inputs and uses 17 boards for parallel processing with each board encoding a row of 7680 × 256 pixels to allow for real time video encoding. The HEVC encoder was shown at the NHK Science & Technology Research Laboratories Open House 2013 that took place from May 30 to June 2.

See also
 NHK
 NHK Twinscam
 Ultra-high-definition television (UHDTV)
 High Efficiency Video Coding (HEVC) – Video codec that supports resolutions up to 8K UHDTV (7680 × 4320)

References

External links
STRL - Japanese
STRL - English
NHK Open House 2013 - English

NHK
Mass media in Tokyo
Television technology
Engineering research institutes
Scientific organizations established in 1930
Audio engineering
Radio technology
Research institutes in Japan
Sound production technology
Sound recording technology
1930 establishments in Japan